Fred Colling (23 November 1897 – 15 April 1973) was an English footballer who made 16 appearances in the Football League playing as a forward for Darlington and Durham City. He also played non-league football for Darlington Railway Athletic, Shildon and Chopwell Institute.

Football career
Colling was born in Crook, County Durham, one of several children of Henry Colling, a coal miner, and his wife Sarah Jane. He played Northern League football for Darlington Railway Athletic, before joining North-Eastern League club Darlington in the second half of the 1920–21 season. After Darlington's election to the newly formed Northern Section of the Football League's third tier, Colling began the 1921–22 season in the club's reserve team, which took the place of the senior team in the North-Eastern League. He made his Football League debut in the fourth match of the campaign, on 17 September away to Chesterfield, replacing Bill Hooper at inside right. Hooper resumed for the next match, and Colling played only once more for Darlington in the League.

He signed for another Northern Section club, Durham City, in June 1922. He impressed in pre-season practice, and played regularly at inside right at the beginning of the campaign. He scored his first goal for Durham in their first win of the season, on 23 September against Accrington Stanley, and scored twice more in the next few matches, but played little in the latter part of the season and finished his Durham career with four goals from fourteen league appearances.

After leaving Durham City, Colling appeared for clubs including Shildon and Chopwell Institute. His application for a permit to resume amateur status was successful. While a permit player, he was caught up in the 1928 illegal payments crisis, in which several hundred amateur players registered to clubs under the auspices of the Durham County Football Association were suspended and deemed professionals for receiving "tea money"payments, often very small, over and above reimbursement of the minimal legitimate expenses allowed. In evidence to the inquiry, Colling admitted that Darlington Railway had paid him up to £1 10s per match, and that as an amateur with Darlington he had received a minimum of 15s per match plus travelling expenses.

Colling was living in Crook at the time of his death in 1973 at the age of 75.

Notes

References

1897 births
1973 deaths
People from Crook, County Durham
Footballers from County Durham
English footballers
Association football forwards
Darlington Railway Athletic F.C. players
Darlington F.C. players
Durham City A.F.C. players
Shildon A.F.C. players
Chopwell Institute F.C. players
Northern Football League players
English Football League players